Festus is a city situated in Jefferson County, Missouri, United States, and is also a suburb of St. Louis. It had a population of 12,706 individuals as of the 2020 census.  Festus as well as its particular neighbor Crystal City are often collectively known as the "Twin Cities situation".

Geography

Festus is situated just west of the Mississippi River. The city is served by I-55 and US routes 61 and 67.

Climate

History 
Festus was first called Tanglefoot, and under the latter name was platted in 1878. A post office called Festus has been in operation since 1883.

Demographics

2010 census
At the 2010 census there were 11,602 individuals, 4,636 households, and 3,036 families living in the city. The racial makeup of the city was 93.5% White, 3.4% African American, 0.2% Native American, 0.8% Asian, 0.2% from other races, and 1.9% from two or more races. Hispanic or Latino of any race were 1.2%.

Of the 4,636 households 37.0% had children under the age of 18 living with them, 46.2% were married couples living together, 14.5% had a female householder with no husband present, 4.8% had a male householder with no wife present, and 34.5% were non-families. 28.7% of households were one person and 12.1% were one person aged 65 or older. The average household size was 2.47 and the average family size was 3.04.

The median age was 34.9 years. 26.8% of residents were under the age of 18; 8.1% were between the ages of 18 and 24; 27.7% were from 25 to 44; 23.5% were from 45 to 64; and 13.9% were 65 or older. The gender makeup of the city was 48.3% male and 51.7% female.

2000 census
At the 2000 census there were 9,660 people, 1,000 households, and 2,606 families living in the city. The racial makeup of the city was 93.66% White, 3.93% African American, 0.30% Native American, 0.72% Asian, 0.04% Pacific Islander, 0.37% from other races, and 0.96% from two or more races. Hispanic or Latino of any race were 1.04%.

Of the 3,861 households 33.3% had children under the age of 18 living with them, 49.7% were married couples living together, 13.5% had a female householder with no husband present, and 32.5% were non-families. 28.0% of households were one person and 12.7% were one person aged 65 or older. The average household size was 2.45 and the average family size was 2.97.

The age distribution was 5.8% under the age of 18, 9.5% from 18 to 24, 28.3% from 25 to 44, 20.5% from 45 to 64, and 15.9% 65 or older. The median age was 36 years. For every 100 females, there were 88.9 males. For every 100 females age 18 and over, there were 84.6 males.

Males had a median income of $36,159 versus $25,108 for females. The per capita income for the city was $19,035. About 7.0% of families and 10.2% of the population were below the poverty line, including 13.6% of those under age 18 and 6.1% of those age 65 or over.

In popular culture
Festus is the home of the alt-country band The Bottle Rockets.

The town is mentioned in the 1974 country song "(We're Not) The Jet Set," in which George Jones and Tammy Wynette sing about road tripping around the Midwestern and Southern part of the United States in a Chevrolet while falling in love.

The Drunken Peasants podcast had a running gag situation in the form of a feud with individual Brett Keane, a YouTuber and resident of Festus. The feud involved satirizing Brett Keane and aspects of Festus.

Education
Festus R-VI School District operates Festus High School.

St. Pius X High School, Our Lady Catholic School (K-8) and Twin City Christian Academy (K-12) are private institutions.

Festus has a lending library, the Festus Public Library.

News and media
 Jefferson County Leader
 KJFF (1400 AM)

Transportation
  Interstate 55
  U.S. Route 61
  U.S. Route 67
 Festus Memorial Airport

Notable Animal
Travis (chimpanzee), animal actor famous for mauling a woman.

See also
 Music of Missouri

References

External links
City of Festus
City-data.com - Festus
 Historic maps of Festus in the Sanborn Maps of Missouri Collection at the University of Missouri

Cities in Jefferson County, Missouri
Cities in Missouri